Miss Iceland or Miss Universe Iceland is a national beauty pageant in Iceland. Began 2023 the winner represents Iceland at Miss Universe pageant.

History
The competition has been carried out since 1950; in the first year it was called Miss Reykjavík (Ungfrú Reykjavík). Since 1955, the contest has taken place under the current name Miss Iceland. In the past, contest winners gained the right to represent Iceland in Miss Universe, Miss World or Miss International. As of 2009, the winner goes on to compete in Miss World. There are six regional preliminary contests in each of the five rural regions and in the capital Reykjavík. 20 to 24 candidates, three to four from each region, take part in the finals.

Iceland is one of the most successful countries at the Miss World pageant with three victories, a record for a nation with a population of less than half million people. 

In 2023, Jorge Esteban and Manuela Ósk Harðardóttir took the brand of Ungfrú Ísland in Iceland after the original organizers abandoned the brand back in 2018 in order to adopt a new format for Miss World in Miss World Iceland.

2013 applicants
Rafn Rafnsson, the new chief executive of the Miss Iceland contest, "in hopes of diversifying the field of contestants beyond the statuesque blonde with striking blue eyes that has become the Icelandic stereotype", said "There is no Miss Iceland stereotype..." One week later, in response to Rafnsson's statement, 1,300 people applied to become Miss Iceland, including several nontraditional candidates, such as:

 Sigríður Guðmarsdóttir, 48, a female governmental minister in Reykjavik
 Reynir Sigurðbjörnsson, 47, a male electrician
 Ása Richardsdóttir, a 49-year-old female producer in the fine arts industry
 Matthildur Helgadóttir-Jónudóttir, a female event manager also in her 40s 
 Brynhildur Heiðardóttir Ómarsdóttir, a female literary critic
 Sigríður Ingibjörg Ingadóttir, a female Member of Parliament for the Social Democratic Alliance
 Guðrún Jónsdóttir, a spokesperson for Stígamót (organization that fights sexual abuse against women)
 Hildur Lillendahl, a feminist in Iceland
 Björk Vilhelmsdóttir, a city councilor of Reykjavík and feminist
 Þórdís Elva Þorvaldsdóttir, a writer and actress

In response to the increase of nontraditional applicants, Rafnsson said, "We have to follow the rules set by the international contest." This "means rejecting any applicants younger than 18 or older than 24. In addition to the age limits, contestants must be unmarried, childless and, of course, female." Íris Telma Jonsdóttir, Iceland's 2012 Miss World contestant, "has the unfortunate job of sifting through applications for the coming Miss Iceland contest and the publicity stirred by feminists has even sparked an abnormally high influx of legitimate hopefuls. That means she has a lot more reading to do before selecting the field of 25 women who will actually compete for a chance to move on to Miss World."

Miss Universe Iceland
In 2016, Jorge Esteban (President of PageantSmart Interview Consulting) and Manuela Osk Hardardottir (former Miss Iceland 2002) were awarded the franchise for Miss Universe Iceland by the Miss Universe Organization. The 2020 Miss Universe Iceland competition was held on Friday, October 23, 2020, at Gamla Bio in downtown Reykjavik. The winner was 21 year old Elísabet Hulda Snorradóttir, a second year student at the University of Iceland, majoring in Chinese Studies. She represented Iceland at the Miss Universe 2020 competition. She succeeds Birta Abiba Þórhallsdóttir, Miss Universe Iceland 2019, who placed in the Top 10 at Miss Universe 2019, the highest placement for Iceland since 1962. The Miss Universe Iceland 2021 competition will be held in Reykjavik on September 29, 2021. The winner will go on to compete at the 70th Miss Universe competition in Eilat, Israel scheduled for December 2021. Previously the Miss Iceland (Ungfru Island) pageant would select the representative to Miss Universe.

Began 2023 the Miss Universe Iceland became the main title of Ungfrú Ísland titleholder after the organizers took over the defunct brand.

2023 applicants
Ungfrú Ísland under the leadership of Manuela Osk Harðardóttir and Jorge Esteban, a new era is ushered in. One national competition for Icelandic women with multiple opportunities for national and international representation.

New rules:
 Open to contestants ages of at least 18 y/o and under 28 as of 1.1.23
 Contestants may be single, currently married or previously married
 Contestants can be pregnant or have children

Titleholders

1955-2017
 Winning International Title  
 Miss Universe Iceland
 Miss World Iceland
 Miss International Iceland  
 Miss Europe Iceland

2016-present
 Winning International Title 
 
Miss Universe Iceland organization began sending a winner directly to Miss Universe in 2016 but before Miss Universe Iceland, Miss Iceland (Ungfru Island) Organization franchised the Miss Universe franchise and the main winner went to Miss Universe starting in 1956. In 2016, a brand new of Miss Universe Iceland organized by separate competition which officially selected a national winning title to Miss Universe. Began 2023  On occasion, when the winner does not qualify (due to age) for either contest, a runner-up is sent.

Titleholders under Ungfrú Ísland org.

Miss Universe Iceland 

 
Ungfrú Ísland winners between 1956 and 2009 competed at Miss Universe pageant. Between 2016 and 2022 the main winner of Miss Universe Iceland went to Miss Universe. Began 2023 the organization of Ungfrú Ísland is official foundation to select the winner to Miss Universe competition under Jorge Esteban and Manuela Ósk Harðardóttir directorship.

Miss Supranational Iceland

Miss Universe Iceland organization was also awarded the Miss Supranational Iceland franchise in 2019. Before Miss Universe Iceland, Miss Iceland (Ungfru Island) Organization franchised the Miss Supranational Iceland franchise and the 1st runner-up went to Miss Supranational. On occasion, when the 1st runner-up does not qualify (due to age) for either contest, a 2nd runner-up is sent.

Notes
 Unnur Steinsson was Miss Iceland 1983 and finished in the top five positions at the Miss World finals the same year. She is the mother of Unnur Birna Vilhjálmsdóttir who won the Miss Iceland pageant in 2005 and became Miss World 2005. Steinsson was three months pregnant when she carried Unnur and competed in the 1983 contest, which was strictly forbidden and could have led to disqualification. Her daughter, Unnur, as mentioned, won the pageant 22 years later.
 In 2011, Guðlaug Dagmar Jónasdóttir won second place and Sigríður Dagbjört Ásgeirsdóttir won third place.

References

External links
 www.missuniverseiceland.com
 Official Miss Universe Iceland

 
Iceland
Beauty pageants in Iceland
Recurring events established in 1950
1950 establishments in Iceland
Icelandic awards
Iceland